Mosaic plant is a common name for several plants and may refer to:

Fittonia albivenis, a plant with leaf veins contrasting in color with the rest of the leaf, giving it a mosaic-like appearance with irregular shapes
Ludwigia sedioides, an aquatic plant with clusters of floating rhomboid leaves, which have a tessellated mosaic-like appearance